The Roman Catholic Diocese of Jackson is a diocese in the ecclesiastical province of Mobile, in the southern United States of America. It is the largest diocese, by area, east of the Mississippi River in the United States.

History
The region which is now the Diocese of Jackson made its first contacts with the Catholic Church through French Jesuit and Capuchin missionaries during the expeditions of La Salle, Marquette, and d'Iberville in the 17th and 18th centuries. In 1787, three Spanish priests, Fathers McKenna, White, and Savage, arrived at Natchez from Salamanca and erected three missions in the vicinity. These missions, however, virtually disappeared after the Spanish turned over the area to the United States. Much valuable property was lost to the Church, and the efforts made to recover it were in vain.

The diocese was originally erected as the Vicariate Apostolic of Mississippi, an administrative region of the church separate from the Diocese of Louisiana and the Two Floridas (Saint Louis of New Orleans) to which it had previously belonged, and which itself would later become the Diocese of New Orleans on 18 July 1826. At the head of the Vicariate was Louis-Guillaume-Valentin DuBourg, P.S.S., who served less than a year before being appointed bishop of Montauban, France (he would eventually become the archbishop of Besançon).

The Vicariate was elevated to the Diocese of Natchez on 28 July 1837. Although the Diocese of Natchez encompassed the entire state of Mississippi, nearly three years passed before John Mary Joseph Chanche, S.S. (1795–1852), president of St. Mary's College in Baltimore, was appointed as its first bishop on 15 December 1840.  Bishop Chanche, like his predecessor, was of French lineage, having been born to parents who had fled to Baltimore from the French colony of Saint-Domingue (present-day Haiti), presumably during the Haitian revolution. At his arrival in Mississippi, he found one priest in the diocese, a Father Brogard, who was there only temporarily. Chanche set to work building a diocesan infrastructure.

In 1842 Bishop Chanche laid the cornerstone of the Cathedral of Our Lady of Sorrows, designed by Robert Cary Long Jr. After the diocesan see was translated to Jackson, this became St. Mary's Basilica. In 1847 the Sisters of Charity of Emmitsburg came to Natchez and established Saint Mary's Orphanage. Chanche attended the First Plenary Council of 1852, held in Baltimore, Maryland. While returning to Natchez, he died at Frederick, Maryland, presumably of cholera. He had built 11 churches, with a team of 11 priests and 13 attendant missions.

A curious series of events regarding the separation of church and state involved the Diocese of Natchez in 1864, during the American Civil War. That year, Bishop William Henry Elder refused to bend to orders from the Federal troops administering Natchez to compel his parishioners to pray for the President of the United States. For this act, Elder was tried, convicted, and then jailed briefly in Vidalia, Louisiana, just across the Mississippi River from Natchez. Elder wrote to President Lincoln explaining that his refusal was not political, but based on the authority of the church to regulate church services. After officials in Washington intervened, Elder was ordered released on 12 August 1864. As of 2006, Elder remains the second-longest-serving bishop in the diocese's history.

By the mid-20th century, the capitol of the state of Mississippi, Jackson, had grown to perhaps be a more appropriate center for the administration of the diocese. To reflect this fact, on 18 December 1956 the name was changed to Diocese of Natchez-Jackson. Finally, on 1 March 1977, the diocese was divided, with the southern counties of Mississippi being reorganized as the Diocese of Biloxi. Concurrently, the Diocese of Natchez-Jackson became simply the Diocese of Jackson.  Since the relocation of the diocese to Jackson, the Diocese of Natchez has been maintained as a titular see.

Sexual abuse
In 2006, the Diocese of Jackson, Mississippi, settled a handful of lawsuits with 19 victims with a $5 million settlement which included an average payout of more than $250,000 for each survivor. In August 2019, it was revealed that a 35-year-old man named La Jarvis D. Love was sexually abused at a Franciscan Friar grade school in Greenwood, Mississippi, when he was a boy and that Order attempted to keep him silent in later years by offering him $15,000. Love and Wisconsin-based Franciscan Friar leader James Gannon secretly signed a non-disclosure agreement in January 2019 which insured that the order would give Love a financial settlement. This came in spite of the fact that the Catholic Church agreed to ban non-disclosure agreements. By August 30, 2019 the accused friar's name was revealed to be Paul West and Love's three cousins Joshua Love, La Jarvis Love and Raphael Love also accused him of sexually abusing them in the mid 1990s. On September 3, 2020, it was revealed that West was extradited from Wisconsin to Mississippi earlier in the week and was being held at Leflore County Jail in Greenwood, Mississippi on sex abuse charges.

Demographics
The first seat of the diocese was Saint Mary Basilica (then Cathedral) in Natchez, whose cornerstone was laid by Bishop Chanche in 1842. The current seat is the Cathedral of St. Peter the Apostle in Jackson. Since 1998, however, the church has maintained a minor basilica at the former cathedral in Natchez; it is now formally known as St. Mary Basilica.

The Diocese of Jackson encompasses an area of the United States that has historically been (and still is) overwhelmingly Protestant. Only about 2.6% of the residents in the diocese are considered Catholic (about 52,000 Catholics out of a total population of nearly 2 million). The diocese contains 74 parishes and has 79 priests.

Bishops

Vicars Apostolic of Mississippi 

 Louis William Valentine DuBourg (1825–1826)

Bishops of Natchez
 John J. Chanche, P.S.S. (1840–1852)
 James Oliver Van de Velde, S.J. (1853–1855)
 William Henry Elder (1857–1880), appointed Archbishop of Cincinnati
 Francis Janssens (1881–1888), appointed Archbishop of New Orleans
 Thomas Heslin (1889–1911)
 John Edward Gunn, S.M. (1911–1924)
 Richard Oliver Gerow (1924–1956), title changed with title of diocese

Bishops of Natchez-Jackson
 Richard Oliver Gerow (1956–1967)
 Joseph Bernard Brunini (1967–1977), title changed with title of diocese

Bishops of Jackson
 Joseph Bernard Brunini (1977–1984)
 William Russell Houck (1984–2003)
 Joseph Nunzio Latino (2003–2013)
 Joseph R. Kopacz (2014–present)

Former auxiliary bishop
 Joseph Bernard Brunini (1957-1967), appointed Bishop here
 Joseph Lawson Howze (1973-1977), appointed Bishop of Biloxi
 William Russell Houck (1979–1984), appointed Bishop here

Other priests of this diocese who became bishops
 Bernard Francis Law, appointed Bishop of Springfield-Cape Girardeau in 1973; future Cardinal
 Ronald Paul Herzog (priest here, 1968-1977), appointed Bishop of Alexandria in 2004

Schools

K-12 schools
Cathedral School (Natchez)
St. Joseph Catholic School (Greenville)
Vicksburg Catholic School (including St. Francis Elementary School and St. Aloysius Middle/High School) (Vicksburg)
Middle Schools and high schools
St. Joseph Catholic School (Madison)

See also

 Catholic Church hierarchy
 List of the Catholic dioceses of the United States
 Natchesium

References

External links
Roman Catholic Diocese of Jackson Official Site

 
Roman Catholic Ecclesiastical Province of Mobile
Catholic Church in Mississippi
Culture of Jackson, Mississippi
1837 establishments in Mississippi
Jackson
Jackson